Davide Orlando (born 13 October 1971) is a Swiss former footballer who played as midfielder in the late 1980s and the 1990s.

Football career
Born in Monthey Orlando played his youth football for local club FC Monthey and played in their first team in 1986. He returned to their youth team the following season ans advanced again in 1988. Local Nationalliga A team FC Sion had been watching his progress and they signed Orlando before the 1990–91 Nationalliga A season. The following 1991–92 Nationalliga A season Orlando won the Swiss championship with his club. Orlando played for Sion for five seasons before moving on.

Orlando joined FC Basel's first team for their 1995–96 season under head-coach Claude Andrey. After playing in one test match and two games in the UEFA Intertoto Cup, Orlando played his domestic league debut for his new club in the away game on 29 July 1995 as Basel were defeated 0–1 by Xamax. Orlando scored his first and only goal for the club in the away game on 20 July 1996. This game was in the UEFA Intertoto Cup but it could not help the team as Basel were defeated 2–3 by Russian team Rotor Volgograd.

Staying with the club for two seasons, Orlando played a total of 63 games for Basel. 40 of these games were in the Nationalliga A, five in the Swiss Cup, four in the Intertoto Cup and 14 were friendly games.

After his time with Basel, Orlando played one season with Étoile Carouge and one season with Lugano. He then returned to play for FC Sion, who in the meantime had suffered relegation to the Nationalliga B. In the 1999–2000 Nationalliga A/B season Orlando achieved immediate promotion with his team.

However, after promotion Orlando moved on to play a season for AC Bellinzona in the second tier of Swiss football. He then played one season for Vevey Sports, in the third tier, and then moved to Martigny-Sports, also in the third tier, where two years later he retired from active football.

Honours

Player
FC Sion
Swiss Cup: 1994–95

References

Sources
 Die ersten 125 Jahre. Publisher: Josef Zindel im Friedrich Reinhardt Verlag, Basel. 
 Verein "Basler Fussballarchiv" Homepage

1971 births
Living people
People from Monthey
FC Monthey players
FC Sion players
FC Basel players
Étoile Carouge FC players
FC Lugano players
AC Bellinzona players
FC Martigny-Sports players
Swiss men's footballers
Association football midfielders
Swiss Super League players
Sportspeople from Valais